= GreenZap =

GreenZap, Inc.
- Industry: Finance
- Key people: Damon Westmoreland
- Website: http://www.greenzap.com/

GreenZap was an online buying and spending account service that claimed to compete with PayPal.

== History ==
GreenZap launched on April 2, 2005 and allowed members to send and receive money online, through their email address. The ultimate beneficial owner of GreenZap was reported to be Damon Westmoreland, who was reportedly associated with ThePayline.com, a widespread Internet financial pyramid. Another report stated that the ownership of GreenZap was unclear because the company was not registered to do business in California, where its mailing address was located in a postal box within a grocery store, and because the company's official phone number was a mobile phone.

== Current status ==
As of December 2010, the site is no longer operational.
